Scaphophyllum speciosum is a species of plant in the family Solenostomataceae. It is found in Bhutan, China, Nepal, and Taiwan. Its natural habitats are temperate forests and subtropical or tropical dry forests. It is threatened by habitat loss.

References

Jungermanniales
Vulnerable plants
Taxonomy articles created by Polbot